Vaazhkai is a 1984 Indian Tamil-language drama film,  directed by  C. V. Rajendran and produced by Chitra Raamu and Chitra Lakshmanan. The film stars Sivaji Ganesan, Ambika and Pandiyan, with Jaishankar, M. N. Nambiar and Raveendran in supporting roles. It is a remake of the Hindi film Avtaar. The film become a blockbuster at the box-office, running for over 100 days in theaters.

Plot
Rajasekar is a hard-working, poor mechanic whose family consists of wife Radha (Ambika), oldest son Baskar (Nizhalgal Ravi), daughter-in-law Sumathi (Unnimary), youngest son Ramesh (Raveendran) and adopted son Kannan (Pandiyan). Rajasekar loses the use of one arm in an accident at work and, for the first time in his life, finds himself out of work. He wants to use his insurance payout from the accident to buy the family home and pay for Ramesh's education. Baskar buys the house but registers it in Sumathi's name rather than his mother's name. Ramesh falls in love with Swapna (Silk Smitha). Her father, rich businessman Seetharaman (M. N. Nambiar), is supportive of the couple but wants Ramesh to live in his home and take charge of his businesses. Rajasekar is skeptical of this arrangement as he is worried about Ramesh being dependent on Seetharaman. Ramesh, however, abandons his parents to live with Swapna. Baskar's duplicity also comes to light after a family argument. Utter disappointed in his children, Rajasekar leaves the home with Radha and Kannan. With hard work and determination, Rajasekar becomes a very wealthy man. His sons' fortunes, on the other hand, fall and family is set against each other.

Cast
Sivaji Ganesan as Rajasekar
Ambika as Radha
Pandiyan as Kannan
Jaishankar as David
M. N. Nambiar as Seetharaman
Nizhalgal Ravi as Baskar
Raveendran as Ramesh
Unnimary/Deepa as Sumathi
Silk Smitha as Swapna
V. K. Ramasamy as Baai
Y. Vijaya as Ayesha
Manorama as Kannaatha
Y. G. Mahendra as Anwar
Thengai Srinivasan

Soundtrack
The music was composed by Ilaiyaraaja. The song "Kaalam Maaralam" is set in Hamsadhvani raga.

References

External links
 

1980s Tamil-language films
1984 drama films
1984 films
Films directed by C. V. Rajendran
Films scored by Ilaiyaraaja
Films with screenplays by Panchu Arunachalam
Indian drama films
Tamil remakes of Hindi films